A week is a unit of time equal to seven days. It is the standard time period used for short cycles of days in most parts of the world. The days are often used to indicate common work days and rest days, as well as days of worship. Weeks are often mapped against yearly calendars, but are typically not the basis for them, as weeks are not based on astronomy.

The modern seven-day week can be traced back to the Babylonians, who used it within their calendar. Other ancient cultures had different week lengths, including ten in Egypt and an eight-day week for Etruscans. The Etruscan week was adopted by the Ancient Romans, but they later moved to a seven-day week, which had spread across Western Asia and the Eastern Mediterranean. In 321 CE, Emperor Constantine officially decreed a seven-day week in the Roman Empire, including making Sunday a public holiday. This later spread across Europe, then the rest of the world.

In English, the names of the days of the week are Monday, Tuesday, Wednesday, Thursday, Friday, Saturday, and Sunday. In many languages, the days of the week are named after gods or planets visible to the eye. Such a week may be called a planetary week. Certain weeks within a year may be designated for a particular purpose, such as Holy Week in Christianity, Golden Week in China, and National Family Week in Canada. More informally, certain groups may advocate awareness weeks, which are designed to draw attention to a certain subject or cause. The term "week" may also be used to refer to a sub-section of the week, such as the workweek and weekend.

Cultures vary in which days of the week are designated the first and the last, though virtually all have Saturday, Sunday or Monday as the first day. The Geneva-based ISO standards organization uses Monday as the first day of the week in its ISO week date system through the international ISO 8601 standard. Most of Europe and China consider Monday the first day of the week, most of North America and South Asia consider Sunday the first day, while Saturday is judged as the first day of the week in much of the Middle East and North Africa. Other regions are mixed, but typically observe either Sunday or Monday as the first day. The Jewish week ends with nightfall on Saturday, at the conclusion of the Sabbath, following the Hebrew Bible in which God created the world in six days and rested on the seventh. Christians set their Sabbath to Sunday, so as not to coincide with Judaism. Muslims set their Sabbath to Friday because it was described as a sacred day of worship in the Quran.

Name

The English word week comes from the Old English , ultimately from a Common Germanic , from a root  "turn, move, change". The Germanic word probably had a wider meaning prior to the adoption of the Roman calendar, perhaps "succession series", as suggested by Gothic  translating  "order" in Luke 1:8.

The seven-day week is named in many languages by a word derived from "seven". The archaism sennight ("seven-night") preserves the old Germanic practice of reckoning time by nights, as in the more common fortnight ("fourteen-night"). Hebdomad and hebdomadal week both derive from the Greek  ("a seven"). Septimana is cognate with the Romance terms derived from Latin  ("seven mornings").

Slavic has a formation *tъ(žь)dьnь (Serbian , Croatian , Ukrainian , Czech , Polish ), from *tъ "this" + *dьnь "day". Chinese has , as it were "planetary time unit".

Definition and duration
A week is defined as an interval of exactly seven days, so that, except when passing through daylight saving time transitions or leap seconds,
1 week = 7 days = 168 hours = 10,080 minutes = 604,800 seconds.
With respect to the Gregorian calendar:
1 Gregorian calendar year = 52 weeks + 1 day (2 days in a leap year)
1 week =  ≈ 22.9984% of an average Gregorian month

In a Gregorian mean year, there are 365.2425 days, and thus exactly  or 52.1775 weeks (unlike the Julian year of 365.25 days or  ≈ 52.1786 weeks, which cannot be represented by a finite decimal expansion).

Relative to the path of the Moon, a week is 23.659% of an average lunation or 94.637% of an average quarter lunation.

Historically, the system of dominical letters (letters A to G identifying the weekday of the first day of a given year) has been used to facilitate calculation of the day of week.
The day of the week can be easily calculated given a date's Julian day number (JD, i.e. the integer value at noon UT):
Adding one to the remainder after dividing the Julian day number by seven (JD modulo 7 + 1) yields that date's ISO 8601 day of the week. In 1973, John Conway devised the Doomsday rule for mental calculation of the weekday of any date in any year.

Days of the week

The days of the week were named for the classical planets. This naming system persisted alongside an "ecclesiastical" tradition of numbering the days in ecclesiastical Latin beginning with Dominica (the Lord's Day) as the first day. The Greco-Roman gods associated with the classical planets were rendered in their interpretatio germanica at some point during the late Roman Empire, yielding the Germanic tradition of names based on indigenous deities.

The ordering of the weekday names is not the classical order of the planets (by distance in the planetary spheres model, nor, equivalently, by their apparent speed of movement in the night sky). Instead, the planetary hours systems resulted in succeeding days being named for planets that are three places apart in their traditional listing. This characteristic was apparently discussed in Plutarch in a treatise written in c. 100 CE, which is reported to have addressed the question of Why are the days named after the planets reckoned in a different order from the actual order? (the text of Plutarch's treatise has been lost).

An ecclesiastical, non-astrological, system of numbering the days of the week was adopted in Late Antiquity. This model also seems to have influenced (presumably via Gothic) the designation of Wednesday as "mid-week" in Old High German and Old Church Slavonic. Old Church Slavonic may have also modeled the name of Monday, after the Latin . The ecclesiastical system became prevalent in Eastern Christianity, but in the Latin West it remains extant only in modern Icelandic, Galician, and Portuguese.

History

Ancient Near East
The earliest evidence of an astrological significance of a seven-day period is connected to Gudea, the priest-king of Lagash in Sumer during the Gutian dynasty (about 2100 BCE), who built a seven-room temple, which he dedicated with a seven-day festival. In the flood story of the Assyro-Babylonian Epic of Gilgamesh, the storm lasts for seven days, the dove is sent out after seven days, and the Noah-like  character of Utnapishtim leaves the ark seven days after it reaches the firm ground. 

Counting from the new moon, the Babylonians celebrated the 7th, 14th, 21st and 28th as "holy days", also called "evil days" (meaning inauspicious for certain activities). On these days, officials were prohibited from various activities and common men were forbidden to "make a wish", and at least the 28th was known as a "rest day".
On each of them, offerings were made to a different god and goddess.

Judaism
A continuous seven-day cycle that runs throughout history without reference to the phases of the moon was first practiced in Judaism, dated to the 6th century BCE at the latest.

There are several hypotheses concerning the origin of the biblical seven-day cycle.

Friedrich Delitzsch and others suggested that the seven-day week being approximately a quarter of a lunation is the implicit astronomical origin of the seven-day week, and indeed the Babylonian calendar used intercalary days to synchronize the last week of a month with the new moon. According to this theory, the Jewish week was adopted from the Babylonians while removing the moon-dependency.

George Aaron Barton speculated that the seven-day creation account of Genesis is connected to the Babylonian creation epic, Enûma Eliš, which is recorded on seven tablets.

In a frequently-quoted suggestion going back to the early 20th century, the Hebrew Sabbath is compared to the Sumerian sa-bat "mid-rest", a term for the full moon. The Sumerian term has been reconstructed as rendered Sapattum or Sabattum in Babylonian, possibly present in the lost fifth tablet of the Enûma Eliš, tentatively reconstructed  "[Sa]bbath shalt thou then encounter, mid[month]ly".

However, Niels-Erik Andreasen, Jeffrey H. Tigay, and others claim that the Biblical Sabbath is mentioned as a day of rest in some of the earliest layers of the Pentateuch dated to the 9th century BCE at the latest, centuries before the Babylonian exile of Judah. They also find the resemblance between the Biblical Sabbath and the Babylonian system to be weak. Therefore, they suggest that the seven-day week may reflect an independent Israelite tradition. Tigay writes:

It is clear that among neighboring nations that were in position to have an influence over Israel – and in fact which did influence it in various matters – there is no precise parallel to the Israelite Sabbatical week. This leads to the conclusion that the Sabbatical week, which is as unique to Israel as the Sabbath from which it flows, is an independent Israelite creation.

The seven-day week seems to have been adopted, at different stages, by the Persian Empire, in Hellenistic astrology, and (via Greek transmission) in Gupta India and Tang China. 
The Babylonian system was received by the Greeks in the 4th century BCE (notably via Eudoxus of Cnidus). However, the designation of the seven days of the week to the seven planets is an innovation introduced in the time of Augustus. The astrological concept of planetary hours is rather an original innovation of Hellenistic astrology, probably first conceived in the 2nd century BCE.

The seven-day week was widely known throughout the Roman Empire by the 1st century CE, along with references to the Jewish Sabbath by Roman authors such as Seneca and Ovid. When the seven-day week came into use in Rome during the early imperial period, it did not immediately replace the older eight-day nundinal system. The nundinal system had probably fallen out of use by the time Emperor Constantine adopted the seven-day week for official use in CE 321, making the Day of the Sun a legal holiday.

Achaemenid period
The Zoroastrian calendar follows the Babylonian in relating the 7th, 14th, 21st, and 28th of the month to Ahura Mazda.
The forerunner of all modern Zoroastrian calendars is the system used to determine dates in the Persian Empire, adopted from the Babylonian calendar by the 4th century BCE.

Frank C. Senn in his book Christian Liturgy: Catholic and Evangelical points to data suggesting evidence of an early continuous use of a seven-day week; referring to the Jews during the Babylonian captivity in the 6th century BCE, after the destruction of the Temple of Solomon.
While the seven-day week in Judaism is tied to Creation account in the Book of Genesis in the Hebrew Bible (where God creates the heavens and the earth in six days and rests on the seventh; Genesis 1:1-2:3, in the Book of Exodus, the fourth of the Ten Commandments is to rest on the seventh day, Shabbat, which can be seen as implying a socially instituted seven-day week), it is not clear whether the Genesis narrative predates the Babylonian captivity of the Jews in the 6th century BCE. At least since the Second Temple period under Persian rule, Judaism relied on the seven-day cycle of recurring Sabbaths.

Tablets from the Achaemenid period indicate that the lunation of 29 or 30 days basically contained three seven-day weeks, and a final week of eight or nine days inclusive, breaking the continuous seven-day cycle.
The Babylonians additionally celebrated the 19th as a special "evil day", the "day of anger", because it was roughly the 49th day of the (preceding) month, completing a "week of weeks", also with sacrifices and prohibitions.

Difficulties with Friedrich Delitzsch's origin theory connecting Hebrew Shabbat with the Babylonian lunar cycle include reconciling the differences between an unbroken week and a lunar week, and explaining the absence of texts naming the lunar week as Shabbat in any language.

Hellenistic and Roman era

In Jewish sources by the time of the Septuagint, the term "Sabbath" (Greek Sabbaton) by synecdoche also came to refer to an entire seven-day week, the interval between two weekly Sabbaths.
Jesus's parable of the Pharisee and the Publican (Luke 18:12) describes the Pharisee as fasting "twice in the week" (Greek  ).
Days of the week are called "days of the sabbath" in the Hebrew language.  In the account of the women finding the tomb empty, they are described as coming there , though modern translations often substitute "week" for "sabbath".

The ancient Romans traditionally used the eight-day nundinum but, after the Julian calendar had come into effect in 45 BCE, the seven-day week came into increasing use. For a while, the week and the nundinal cycle coexisted, but by the time the week was officially adopted by Constantine in 321 CE, the nundinal cycle had fallen out of use. The association of the days of the week with the Sun, the Moon and the five planets visible to the naked eye dates to the Roman era (2nd century).

The continuous seven-day cycle of the days of the week can be traced back to the reign of Augustus; the first identifiable date cited complete with day of the week is 6 February 60 CE, identified as a "Sunday" (as  "eighth day before the ides of February, day of the Sun") in a Pompeiian graffito. According to the (contemporary) Julian calendar, 6 February 60 was, however, a Wednesday. This is explained by the existence of two conventions of naming days of the weeks based on the planetary hours system: 6 February was a "Sunday" based on the sunset naming convention, and a "Wednesday" based on the sunrise naming convention.

Islamic concept
According to Islamic beliefs, the seven-day a week concept started with the creation of the universe by Allah. Abu Huraira reported that Muhammad said: Allah, the Exalted and Glorious, created the clay on Saturday and He created the mountains on Sunday and He created the trees on Monday and He created the things entailing labour on Tuesday and created light on Wednesday and He caused the animals to spread on Thursday and created Adam after 'Asr on Friday; the last creation at the last hour of the hours of Friday, i. e. between afternoon and night.

Adoption in Asia

China and Japan
The earliest known reference in Chinese writings to a seven-day week is attributed to Fan Ning, who lived in the late 4th century in the Jin dynasty, while diffusions from the Manichaeans are documented with the writings of the Chinese Buddhist monk Yi Jing and the Ceylonese or Central Asian Buddhist monk Bu Kong of the 7th century (Tang dynasty).

The Chinese variant of the planetary system was brought to Japan by the Japanese monk Kūkai (9th century). Surviving diaries of the Japanese statesman Fujiwara Michinaga show the seven-day system in use in Heian Period Japan as early as 1007. In Japan, the seven-day system was kept in use for astrological purposes until its promotion to a full-fledged Western-style calendrical basis during the Meiji Period (1868–1912).

India
The seven-day week was known in India by the 6th century, referenced in the Pañcasiddhāntikā. Shashi (2000) mentions the Garga Samhita, which he places in the 1st century BCE or CE, as a possible earlier reference to a seven-day week in India. He concludes "the above references furnish a terminus ad quem (viz. 1st century) The terminus a quo cannot be stated with certainty".

Christian Europe

The seven-day weekly cycle has remained unbroken in Christendom, and hence in Western history, for almost two millennia, despite changes to the Coptic, Julian, and Gregorian calendars, demonstrated by the date of Easter Sunday having been traced back through numerous computistic tables to an Ethiopic copy of an early Alexandrian table beginning with the Easter of 311 CE.

A tradition of divinations arranged for the days of the week on which certain feast days occur develops in the Early Medieval period. There are many later variants of this, including the German  and the versions of Erra Pater published in 16th to 17th century England, mocked in Samuel Butler's Hudibras. South and East Slavic versions are known as koliadniki (from koliada, a loan of Latin ), with Bulgarian copies dating from the 13th century, and Serbian versions from the 14th century.

Medieval Christian traditions associated with the lucky or unlucky nature of certain days of the week survived into the modern period. This concerns primarily Friday, associated with the crucifixion of Jesus. Sunday, sometimes personified as Saint Anastasia, was itself an object of worship in Russia, a practice denounced in a sermon extant in copies going back to the 14th century.

Justin Martyr wrote: "the first day after the Sabbath, remaining the first of all the days, is called, however, the eighth, according to the number of all the days of the cycle, and [yet] remains the first."

A period of eight days, usually (but not always, mainly because of Christmas Day) starting and ending on a Sunday, is called an octave, particularly in Roman Catholic liturgy. In German, the phrase  (literally "today in eight days") can also mean one week from today (i.e. on the same weekday). The same is true of the Italian phrase  (literally "today eight") and the French .

Numbering

Weeks in a Gregorian calendar year can be numbered for each year. This style of numbering is often used in European and Asian countries. It is less common in the U.S. and elsewhere.

The ISO week date system 

The system for numbering weeks is the ISO week date system, which is included in ISO 8601. This system dictates that each week begins on a Monday and is associated with the year that contains that week's Thursday.

Determining Week 1 
In practice week 1 (W01 in ISO notation) of any year can be determined as follows:

 If January 1 falls on a Monday, Tuesday, Wednesday or Thursday, then the week of January 1 is Week 1. Except in the case of January 1 falling on a Monday, this Week 1 includes the last day(s) of the previous year.
 If January 1 falls on a Friday, Saturday, or Sunday, then January 1 is considered to be part of the last week of the previous year. Week 1 will begin on the first Monday after January 1.

Examples:

 Week 1 of 2015 (2015W01 in ISO notation) started on Monday, 29 December 2014 and ended on Sunday, 4 January 2015, because 1 January 2015 fell on Thursday.
 Week 1 of 2021 (2021W01 in ISO notation) started on Monday, 4 January 2021 and ended on Sunday, 10 January 2021, because 1 January 2021 fell on Friday.

Week 52 and 53 
It is also possible to determine if the last week of the previous year was Week 52 or Week 53 as follows:

 If January 1 falls on a Friday, then it is part of Week 53 of the previous year (W53-5). 
 If January 1 falls on a Saturday,
 then it is part of Week 53 of the previous year if that is a leap year (W53-6),
 and part of Week 52 otherwise (W52-6), i.e. if the previous year is a common year. 
 If January 1 falls on a Sunday, then it is part of Week 52 of the previous year (W52-7).

Schematic representation of ISO week date 

Notes
1. Numbers and letters in parentheses,, apply to March − December in leap years.
2. Underlined numbers and letters belong to previous year or next year.
3. First date of the first week in the year.
4. First date of the last week in the year.

Other week numbering systems 
In some countries, though, the numbering system is different from the ISO standard. At least six numberings are in use: 

Because the week starts on either Saturday, Sunday, or Monday in all these systems, the days in a workweek, Monday through Friday, will always have the same week number within a calendar week system. Quite often, these systems will agree on the week number for each day in a workweek:

 In years where 1 January is a Monday, Tuesday, Wednesday, or Thursday, all of the above week numbering systems will agree. 
 In years where 1 January is a Friday, ISO-8601 will be different, but the rest will agree. 
 In years where 1 January is a Saturday, ISO-8601 and the Middle Eastern system will agree, being different from Western Traditional and the Broadcast Calendar which will agree. 
 In years where 1 January is a Sunday, the Broadcast Calendar will be different, but the rest will agree.

Note that this agreement occurs only for the week number of each day in a work week, not for the day number within the week, nor the week number of the weekends.

The epi week (epidemiological week) is used to report healthcare statistics, as with COVID-19 cases:
The epidemiological week begins on Sunday and ends on Saturday. The first epidemiological week of the year ends on the first Saturday of January, provided that it falls at least four or more days into the month. Therefore, the first epidemiological week may actually begin in December of the previous year.

Uses 
The semiconductor package date code is often a 4 digit date code YYWW where the first two digits YY are the last 2 digits of the calendar year and the last two digits WW are the two-digit week number.

The tire date code mandated by the US DOT is a 4 digit date code WWYY with two digits of the week number WW followed by the last two digits of the calendar year YY.

"Weeks" in other calendars
The term "week" is sometimes expanded to refer to other time units comprising a few days. Such "weeks" of between four and ten days have been used historically in various places. Intervals longer than 10 days are not usually termed "weeks" as they are closer in length to the fortnight or the month than to the seven-day week.

Pre-modern calendars
Calendars unrelated to the Chaldean, Hellenistic, Christian, or Jewish traditions often have time cycles between the day and the month of varying lengths, sometimes also called "weeks".

An eight-day week was used in Ancient Rome and possibly in the pre-Christian Celtic calendar. Traces of a nine-day week are found in Baltic languages and in Welsh. The ancient Chinese calendar had a ten-day week, as did the ancient Egyptian calendar (and, incidentally, the French Republican Calendar, dividing its 30-day months into thirds).

A six-day week is found in the Akan Calendar and Kabiye culture until 1981. Several cultures used a five-day week, including the 10th century Icelandic calendar, the Javanese calendar, and the traditional cycle of market days in Korea. The Igbo have a "market week" of four days. Evidence of a "three-day week" has been derived from the names of the days of the week in Guipuscoan Basque.

The Aztecs and Mayas used the Mesoamerican calendars. The most important of these calendars divided a ritual cycle of 260 days (known as Tonalpohualli in Nahuatl and Tzolk'in in Yucatec Maya) into 20 weeks of 13 days (known in Spanish as trecenas). They also divided the solar year into 18 periods (winal) of 20 days and five nameless days (wayebʼ), creating a 20-day month divided into four five-day weeks. The end of each five-day week was a market day.

The Balinese Pawukon is a 210-day calendar consisting of 10 different simultaneously running weeks of 1, 2, 3, 4, 5, 6, 7, 8, 9, and 10 days, of which the weeks of 4, 8, and 9 days are interrupted to fit into the 210-day cycle.

Modern calendar reforms

The International Fixed Calendar (also known as the "Eastman plan") kept a 7-day week while defining a year of 13 months with 28 days each (364 days). Every calendar date was always on the same weekday. It was the official calendar of the Eastman Kodak Company for decades.

A 10-day week, called a décade, was used in France for nine and a half years from October 1793 to April 1802; furthermore, the Paris Commune adopted the Revolutionary Calendar for 18 days in 1871.

The Bahá'í calendar features a 19-day period which some classify as a month and others classify as a week.

Soviet calendar

In the Soviet Union between 1929 and 1940, most factory and enterprise workers, but not collective farm workers, used five and six day work weeks while the country as a whole continued to use the traditional seven day week.

From 1929 to 1951, five national holidays were days of rest. Workers were assigned any one of the five days as their day off, even if their spouse or friends might be assigned a different day off. From summer 1931 until , each Gregorian month was subdivided into five six day work weeks, more-or-less, beginning with the first day of each month. The sixth day of each six day work week was a uniform day of rest. On  74.2% of industrial workers were on non-continuous schedules, mostly six day work weeks, while 25.8% were still on continuous schedules, mostly five day work weeks. The Gregorian calendar with its irregular month lengths and the traditional seven day week were used in the Soviet Union during its entire existence, including 1929–1940; for example, in the masthead of Pravda, the official Communist newspaper, and in both Soviet calendars displayed here. The traditional names of the seven day week continued to be used, including "Resurrection" (Воскресенье) for Sunday and "Sabbath" (Суббота) for Saturday, despite the government's official atheism.

Irregular weeks 
 
The "Hermetic Lunar Week Calendar" is a strictly lunar calendar, apparently proposed to illustrate the complications of astronomically based calendars. Its unique feature is irregular-length "weeks" which average approximately  days each. The weeks are fixed by the astronomical phases of the moon; the last day of the week fixed to coincide with a new-moon, first quarter-moon, full-moon, or third quarter-moon. Although typical months have three weeks of 7 days and one week of 8 days (29 day month) or two weeks of 7 days and two weeks of 8 days (30 day month), due to variations in the moon's orbit, the weeks in the Hermetic calendar range 6–9 days.

See also

Determination of the day of the week
GPS week number
Names of the days of the week
Workweek and weekend

Notes

References

Further reading

 
Units of time